Al Madam is an inland town of the Emirate of Sharjah, the UAE. Located at the intersection of the Dubai-Hatta (E44) and Mleiha-Shwaib (E55) roads, its development has mainly centred around these road links and the road traffic through Hatta to Oman. The volume of traffic to Oman through Madam and Hatta has lessened since the closure of the 'soft' Omani border at Mahda in 2016, although traffic volumes remain at some 5,000 travellers daily. The road from Madam to Hatta is now only open to UAE or Omani nationals and permit holders.

Description 

The strip development of Madam along the E44 towards the 'dune bashing' tourist centre of Badayer (with its celebrated 'Big Red' sand dune) has resulted in the town becoming elongated, and includes the 'first shopping mall' to open there. This is in addition to municipal facilities, a medical centre, wedding hall and a large number of shops located along the main street of the town. Al Madam is home to an annual shopping festival.

In an area of desert to the south of Madam, a small and deserted development of houses and a mosque can be found, referred to locally as both Madam Old Town and Ghost Town. The area around Al Madam is also home to a number of Iron Age archaeological sites, including those of Al Thuqaibah and Jebel Buhais, as well as aflāj (water systems) dating back to the 1st millennium BC. To the East of the town is the C19th Fili Fort.

See also 
 Archaeology of the United Arab Emirates
 History of the United Arab Emirates
 List of Ancient Settlements in the UAE
 Al Ain, connected by road to Al-Shwaib of the Emirate of Abu Dhabi, connected to Al-Madam by road

References 

Archaeological sites in the United Arab Emirates
Al-Madam, Sharjah
Populated places in the Emirate of Sharjah